Peter Jewell Heck (born September 4, 1941, in Chestertown, Maryland) is an American science fiction and mystery author.  His books include the "Mark Twain Mysteries"—historical whodunits featuring the famous author as a detective—and four books in the "Phule's Company" series, in collaboration with Robert Asprin, best described as "F-Troop in space". He also wrote the 36th chapter of Atlanta Nights, a book meant to ruin PublishAmerica's reputation.

Heck has also been an editor at Ace Books (where he edited Lynn S. Hightower and Robert J. Sawyer, among others), and created the SF newsletter Xignals and its mystery equivalent Crime Times for the Waldenbooks chain. He is also a regular reviewer for Asimov's Science Fiction and Kirkus Reviews.

In 2007, Heck began working as a reporter at the Kent County News in Chestertown, MD, where he and his wife moved after a number of years in Brooklyn, NY. His work for the paper includes articles on local government and history, health, environment, and the arts; it has won several awards from the MDDC Press Association. He also plays guitar and banjo in a local band, Col. Leonard's Irregulars. In 2017, Heck and his wife became editors of The Chestertown Spy, an online newspaper.

Bibliography

Novels
The Mark Twain Mysteries
 
 
 
 
 
 

Phule's Company with Robert Asprin

Review columns

External links
 

1941 births
Living people
20th-century American novelists
21st-century American novelists
American male novelists
American mystery writers
American science fiction writers
Asimov's Science Fiction people
20th-century American male writers
21st-century American male writers